Sergey Olegovich Bida (born 13 February 1993) is a Russian left-handed épée fencer, three-time team European champion, and 2021 team Olympic silver medalist.

At the 2019 World Fencing Championships, he won the individual silver medal in the épée tournament. He studied Sports Studies at the Russian State University of Physical Education, Sport, Youth and Tourism in Moscow. In 2019, Bida was given the title Honoured Master of Sport by the Russian Federation. He was named the 2019 Male Fencer of the Year.

Personal life 
Bida's maternal grandmother, Valentina Rastvorova, won team gold and individual silver in women's foil in the Olympics in 1960 in Rome, as well as team silver in 1964 in Tokyo. His maternal grandfather, Boris Grishin, won Olympic silver in 1968 in Mexico City and Olympic bronze in 1964 in Tokyo in water polo. His maternal uncle, Yevgeny Grishin, won Olympic water polo gold in 1980 in Moscow and Olympic water polo bronze in 1988 in Seoul. His mother is Yelena Grishina, a two time finalist in Olympic foil.

Bida was originally set to follow in his grandfather and uncle's footsteps in competitive water polo, however he got a severe case of sinusitis when he was twelve years old that prevented him from getting in the pool. He took up epee instead as he was too old to begin in other sports.

Medal record

Olympic Games

World Championship

European Championship

Grand Prix

World Cup

References

External links
 
 
 

1993 births
Living people
Russian male épée fencers
Universiade medalists in fencing
Universiade gold medalists for Russia
European Games silver medalists for Russia
European Games medalists in fencing
Fencers at the 2015 European Games
Martial artists from Moscow
Medalists at the 2017 Summer Universiade
Olympic fencers of Russia
Fencers at the 2020 Summer Olympics
Olympic silver medalists for the Russian Olympic Committee athletes
Olympic medalists in fencing
Medalists at the 2020 Summer Olympics
Left-handed fencers
Russian people of Ukrainian descent